Larry Earnest "L. W." Wright is an American confidence trickster. In 1982, he posed as a stock car racing driver to compete in the Winston 500, a NASCAR Winston Cup Series race at Talladega Superspeedway.

1982 Winston 500
In April 1982, William Dunaway of Hendersonville, Tennessee, contacted a Nashville newspaper to promote a driver named L. W. Wright, who declared he was entering the Winston 500 with Music City Racing. Claiming to be a 33-year-old driver with 43 NASCAR Busch Grand National Series starts, Wright also announced country artists Merle Haggard, T. G. Sheppard, and Waylon Jennings were to sponsor his team. To participate in the race, Wright submitted a check worth $115 to NASCAR for a competition license; although sanctioning body officials were skeptical of his background, right to work laws required NASCAR to allow him to race if he could pay for the license and $100 entry fee and provide a capable car. As part of Music City Racing, Lloyd Barber and Rick Wright also applied for drivers permits, while Dunaway, Freddy Case, Willis Judd, Michael Smith, and Ellis White requested mechanics licenses.

Wright approached B. W. "Bernie" Terrell, head of Nashville-based Space Age Marketing, for assistance in buying and sponsoring a car. In addition to $30,000 to purchase the vehicle, Terrell gave him a semi-trailer truck and $7,500 to cover expenses. He eventually bought a Chevrolet Monte Carlo from Sterling Marlin for $20,700 with $17,000 in cash and a check for the remainder; suspicious of the excessively high money spending, Marlin followed Wright to Talladega to serve as his crew chief. Other payments included $1,500–1,800 to Goodyear for tires, $1,200 to driver Travis Tiller for parts, and $168 to the Southern Textile Association's Wayne Wilson for racing jackets.

After Wright conducted a newspaper interview to promote his entry, Sheppard denied his involvement in the effort, with Nashville Speedway co-owner and Sheppard's tax attorney Gary Baker adding he "had never even heard of the guy". When he was questioned at Talladega about Sheppard and his racing career, Wright claimed the Sheppard sponsorship was "premature" and admitted he had participated in Sportsman class races that took place at Grand National tracks, but not in a Grand National race. Marlin expressed further suspicion at Wright's behavior at the track, who regularly asked "questions any driver should have known". Wright crashed in practice, but was able to repair his car and qualified 36th. In the race, he was ordered to exit after 13 laps for being too slow and finished 39th. He received $1,545 in prize money but no points in the Cup standings as a late entrant.

Aftermath
Following the race, Wright disappeared and left the car at the speedway, where Terrell recovered it. While missing, he was announced as having failed to qualify for the next race, the Cracker Barrel Country Store 420 at Nashville Speedway. It was later revealed that the checks which Wright gave were invalid; South Central Bell and Wright's landlord received bad checks worth $700 and $4,500, respectively, while United Trappers Marketing Association owner Dean McIntire lost over $10,000 to Wright. Marlin commented the bounced check "didn't really surprise me. I sort of expected it."

NASCAR arranged for arrest warrants, while Terrell hired a private investigator to search for Wright. Wright was referred to as the "D. B. Cooper of NASCAR" by a Racing-Reference writer and in a documentary aired on NASCAR Race Hub for his immediate disappearance and unknown whereabouts.

Discovery 
On April 29, 2022, Rick Houston of the Scene Vault Podcast announced that they had found Wright, releasing a podcast interview with him on May 2, 2022, the 40th anniversary of Wright's infamous race and disappearance. The podcast announcement included an audio clip of Wright identifying himself.

Arrest 
On February 13, 2023, Wright was arrested in Knox County, Tennessee by the United States Marshals Fugitive Task Force. He was charged with theft, burglary, and evading arrest.

Motorsports career results

NASCAR
(key) (Bold – Pole position awarded by qualifying time. Italics – Pole position earned by points standings or practice time. * – Most laps led.)

Winston Cup Series

References

External links

NASCAR drivers
Confidence tricksters
Unidentified American criminals
Living people
Year of birth missing (living people)
Unsolved crimes in the United States
20th-century American criminals
NASCAR controversies